Wyckoff may refer to:

People
Albert Capwell Wyckoff (1903–1953), American Presbyterian minister and mystery writer
Alvin Wyckoff (1877–1957), American cinematographer
Brooke Wyckoff (born 1980), American basketball player and coach
Charles Wyckoff (1916–1998), American photochemist
Clint Wyckoff (1874–1947), American collegiate football player
Edward Wyckoff Williams (born 1978), American journalist
James Wyckoff (active 2015), American education economist
Michael Wyckoff (born 1994), American film composer
Pieter Claesen Wyckoff (ca. 1620–1694), prominent figure in early Dutch-American history
Ralph Walter Graystone Wyckoff (1897–1994), American crystallographer
Richard Wyckoff (1873–1934), American investor
Russell Wyckoff (1925–2004), American politician from Iowa
Weldon Wyckoff (1893–1961), American baseball pitcher

Places
Wyckoff, New Jersey
Wyckoff-Garretson House, in Somerset, New Jersey
Wyckoff House, in Brooklyn, New York
Wyckoff-Snediker Family Cemetery, in Queens, New York
Wyckoff Land, Greenland
Cape Wyckoff, Greenland
Mount Wyckoff, Greenland

Other uses
Wyckoff positions, in crystallography

See also
Wykoff, Minnesota